The 7th West Virginia Cavalry Regiment was a cavalry regiment that served in the Union Army during the American Civil War.

Service
The 7th West Virginia Cavalry Regiment was organized from the 8th West Virginia Volunteer Infantry Regiment on January 26, 1864, which was recruited from the central and southern counties of Braxton, Clay, Jackson, Kanawha, Putnam, Raleigh, Fayette, Boone, Logan and Wyoming.

The 7th West Virginia Cavalry Regiment mustered out on August 1, 1865.

Commanders
 Colonel John H. Oley

References
The Civil War Archive
7th West Virginia Cavalry web site

See also
West Virginia Units in the Civil War
West Virginia in the Civil War

Units and formations of the Union Army from West Virginia
1864 establishments in West Virginia
Military units and formations established in 1864
Military units and formations disestablished in 1865